Anton C. Falch (December 4, 1860 – March 31, 1936) was a Major League Baseball player. He went 2-for-18 at the plate for a batting average of .111.

Sources

Major League Baseball left fielders
Major League Baseball catchers
Milwaukee Brewers (UA) players
Milwaukee Brewers (minor league) players
Baseball players from Milwaukee
1860 births
1936 deaths
19th-century baseball players